Helga Schubert (pseudonym for Helga Helm, born 7 January 1940 in Berlin) is a German psychologist and author.

Life

Helga Schubert is a daughter of a librarian, who was also active in economics, and of a Gerichtsassessor who died as a soldier in 1941; she grew up in East Berlin. Schubert completed her Reifeprüfung (secondary school examination) and afterwards worked for a year on the assembly line in an industrial plant in Berlin. From 1958 to 1963, she studied psychology at Humboldt University and obtained a diploma in psychology. From 1963 to 1977, she was a full-time clinical psychologist; until 1973, she worked in adult psychotherapy. From 1973 to 1977, she studied for a PhD at Humboldt University but did not obtain the doctorate. From 1977 until 1987, she was active as a conversational therapist at a marital-counseling center in Berlin. During that period, she worked part-time as a psychologist and also as an author. From December 1989 until March 1990, she was a non-partisan press spokeswoman of the East German Round Table in East Berlin.

Schubert, who had wanted to write since she was in her twenties, published a series of children's literature and prose that portrayed everyday life in East Germany. She also wrote theater dramas, radio dramas, television plays, and movie scenarios. After the German reunification, she became known for her documentary work "Judasfrauen," which dealt with denunciation in the Third Reich, based on archival work. Schubert, who belonged to the Schriftstellerverband der DDR (Writer's Association of East Germany) from 1976 and PEN Centre of East Germany from 1987, moved to PEN Centre Germany in 1991.

Works
  (A Lot of Lives), Berlin 1975
  (Bimmi and the Highrise Ghost), Berlin 1980
  (Bimmi and the Victoria A), Berlin 1981 (together with Jutta Kirschner)
  (The Worry), Berlin 1982
  (Bimmi and the Black Day), Berlin 1982 (with Jutta Kirschner)
  (The Forbidden Room), Darmstadt [et al.] 1982
  (Bimmi and Her Afternoon), Berlin 1984 (with Jutta Kirschner)
  (Point of View), Berlin [u. a.] 1984
  (Anna Can Speak German), Darmstadt [et al.] 1985
  (And Again Tomorrow ...), Berlin 1985
  (Beautiful Trip), Berlin [u. a.] 1988
  (Speak about Feelings?), Berlin 1988
  (Do Women Go Down on Their Knees?), Zürich 1990 (with Rita Süssmuth)
  (Judas Women. Ten Case Stories of Female Denunciation in the Third Reich), Berlin 1990
  (Do Women Pay for Reunification?), Munich [et al.] 1992 (with Rita Süssmuth)
  (Bimmi of the Highrise), Berlin 1992 (with Cleo-Petra Kurze)
  (The Dissenter), Munich 1994
  (The Cracked Heart), Munich 1995
  (The World Inside), Frankfurt am Main 2003

Literature
 Alessandro Bigarelli:  (Ethics and Discourse in Women's Writing as Exemplified in Helga Schubert's Stories), Frankfurt a. M., Lang, 1998.

References

External links
 
 Author Circle of Germany - Schubert page (German)

1940 births
Writers from Berlin
Living people
Heinrich Mann Prize winners
German women writers
German women psychologists
Recipients of the Heinrich Greif Prize
Ingeborg Bachmann Prize winners